The Ministry of Justice of Transnistria (Pridnestrovskaia Moldavskaia Respublika) ensures the law-making activity of the President of the Pridnestrovskaia Moldavskaia Respublika and executive bodies of state power by doing the following:

 Drafting legislation, bylaws, and other normative acts and conclusions in accordance with the Constitution of the Pridnestrovskaia Moldavskaia Respublika
 Examining laws and overseeing the systematization of legislation
 Organizing a system of legal services that realize the rights, freedoms and legitimate interests of citizens of Transnistria

History 

In 1991, the Pridnestrovskaia Moldavskaia Respublika (PMR) leadership faced the rather difficult task of preserving what was inherited from the Soviet Union in terms of economy, social sphere, education, culture, rule of law and human rights protection. The young republic needed to form a new system of public authorities and government. Thus, in May 1991, the structure of the PMR government was approved and there was an initial effort to create administrations rather than ministries. On July 24, 1991, the Edict of the President of the PMR formulated the Department of Justice.

On September 8, 1992, the Ministry of Justice of the PMR was established by the decree of the Supreme Council of the PMR on the basis of the Republican Department of Justice. It was necessary to re-staff all the organs of justice such as the people's courts, the departments of the registry office, the notary, and the bar. As of August 20, 1992, the notary's office of Dubossary (Dubossary district) has passed under the jurisdiction of the PMR. Notary offices were established on June 1, 1993 in the cities of Tiraspol, Bendery, Grigoriopol, Rybnitsa, Kamenka and Slobodzeya. In mid-2000, the executive bodies of state power were reorganized and the PMR Cabinet of Ministers was formed. Significant changes that have occurred in all branches of public administration have also affected the justice bodies.

In 2001, on the initiative of the Ministry of Justice, the Assembly of Acts of Legislation (SAZ) of the PMR was published for the first time in the Republic. In 2003, by the decree of the President of the PMR, the Criminal Justice Department of the Ministry of Justice was reorganized into the State Service for the Execution of Sentences and Judgments, which included the Department for Execution of Judicial Decisions. It laid the groundwork for the formation of an independent structure—namely the Judicial Service Service under the Ministry of Justice. On January 1, 2008, in accordance with the Decree of the President of the PMR, the State Registration and Notariate Service was established.

The Ministry of Justice has priorities such as the enforcement of criminal penalties appointed by the courts in criminal cases, the execution of judgments in civil and administrative cases, the implementation of state registration of legal facts and the issuance of licenses, the ensuring of the protection of the rights and legal interests of citizens and legal entities in the implementation of notarial acts, and further improving the current Transnistrian legislation on the basis of its harmonization with the legislation of the Russian Federation.

Structure

The ministry is structured as follows:
 Central Appartements
 State Registration Service and Notaries
 State Service for the Execution of Sentences
 State Service for Management of Documentation and Archives of PMR
 State Supervision Service of the MJ of the PMR
 Office of Forensic Expertise

List of ministers

Republican Department of Justice

Ministry of Justice 
It was created on September 8, 1992 by the Decree of the Supreme Council of the PMR on the basis of the Republican Department of Justice

See also 

 Justice ministry
 Министерство юстиции Приднестровской Молдавской Республики [Ministry of Justice of the Pridnestrovskaia Moldavskaia Respublika]
 Politics of Transnistria

References 

Transnistria
Justice ministries
Government of Transnistria

ko:트란스니스트리아 법무부
ru:Министерство юстиции Приднестровской Молдавской Республики